Cobus Pienaar (born 23 October 1985) is a South African cricketer. He made his first-class debut for Combined Easterns–Northerns XI against Zimbabweans during Zimbabwe's tour to South Africa in 2005.

References

External links
 

1985 births
Living people
South African cricketers
Easterns cricketers
Northerns cricketers
Titans cricketers
People from Klerksdorp